Emily Blue (born Emily Caroline Otnes on June 28, 1994) is an American singer-songwriter of Norwegian descent. She has both a solo career is the lead singer of Champaign-based indie rock band Tara Terra. Born and raised in Urbana, Illinois, she is now lives in Chicago and Nashville.
Blue's career is characterized by sharp changes in musical style, and her releases fall into vastly different genre classifications, ranging from synth-pop to avant-garde and death metal.

Life and career 
Emily Blue was born as Emily Caroline Otnes on June 28, 1994, in Urbana, Illinois. She wrote her first song when she was 13, and got motivated to become a songwriter. She says her mother was the guiding figure in her home, and that she inspired her by taking a powerful female role in the household.

She met Colin Althaus and Joey Buttlar in the early 2010s and they joined Nick Soria and Céline Broussard to form Emily Otnes and the Weekdays, later renamed to Tara Terra. Otnes changed her name to Emily Blue. Tara Terra released their debut album, Daughter, on August 30, 2014.

2016–2017: Solo career and Where's Your Light? 

In 2016, Blue went through a mentally difficult time and felt the need to express her thoughts about womanhood, rape culture, and trauma. According to her, she packed those emotions that she felt in song form.

Blue's first single, "No Pain", was released on August 6, 2016 with lyrics about rape culture. The Another Angry Woman EP, was released on November 4, 2016 with five music tracks and three one minute interview tracks. Its lyrics are on subjects considered taboo, but conveyed with a mellow indie pop sound. According to Blue, the title of the EP "is a title that intends to take a critical stance on our culture's lack of empathy towards survivors". All the income from the album sales and merchandise for Another Angry Woman went to RACES (Rape Advocacy, Counseling, & Education Services) organization.

Blue released the two-sided single, "Blackberries // Rico Acid" on April 7, 2017  with an up-tempo pop sound. "Blackberries" became popular on music streaming service Spotify. It was Blue's first collaboration with Max Perenchio.

Tara Terra released the Where's Your Light? album in 2017, preceded by the single "Like the Clothes". Huffington Post praised the track, labeling it as the band "[showing] off their rhythmic chemistry underneath Blue's falsettos and [Colin] Althaus's bright guitar riffs." It was described as having a harder sound than their 2014 release and received mostly positive reviews. The band went on indefinite hiatus the same year.

2018: *69 EP 

On April 6, 2018, Blue released "Cellophane", an experimental and heavily synthesized pop track. This became the first single from *69 EP, produced by and written with Bad City's Max Perenchio. It was released on August 8, 2018.

The second song from this extended play, "Microscope", was released five days before the EP was out. The sound on the EP was described by Chicago Reader as "a glossy, idea-packed EP whose five tunes burst with pulsing electro beats and walloping synth-pop choruses". It was also said that a few listens to Blue's "Microscope" and "Falling in Love", "make it clear that she can translate her razor-sharp hooks into any musical language". On the album's re-release, three songs were added to the tracklist.

2019: Tara Terra reformation and ICONIC 
On January 10, 2019, Blue commercially released Emily Blue on Audiotree Live with the songs from *69, except "Dum Blonde", and three of her earlier singles.

On March 8 of the same year, Blue released a pop-rock cover of Blondie's "Call Me", just three weeks before the release of Tara Terra's comeback single "Ithaca", which was revealed on April 1, 2019, premiering on Atwood Magazine. This album added Evan Opitz as official guitarist of Tara Terra.

On April 7, 2019. Blue released a five-track extended play: Couch Surfer, Lover.

The single "Bad Decisions" was made available on all platforms on June 28, 2019, Blue's 25th birthday. The cover art for the album depicted the singer mooning the camera in front of a McDonald's.

On October 11, 2019, the singer released an indie-metal fusion track titled "17" on Spotify. The song was described both by reviewers and fans and by Blue herself as inspired by Lana Del Rey.

On October 14, 2019, Blue announced an 18+ LGBT music festival organised by her, titled ICONIC. The festival took place on December 6, at Schuba's Tavern and included performances from Chicago band Flora, artists Carlile, SuperKnova, Thair and GirlBoifriend. According to the festival's site, a portion of the proceeds went to nonprofit organization Brave Space Alliance, a pro-trans rights organization.

On November 8, 2019, Blue won first place in Chicago Reader's year-end Best Pop Artist award.

2020-present: COVID-19, new beginnings, The Afterlove 

In 2020, in light of the COVID-19 pandemic, Blue launched an initiative entitled "Artists for Global Giving". The concept of the project was that artists in lockdown make tracks from quarantine within 24 hours, with all tracks compiled into a mixtape, the proceeds of which go to COVID-19 relief funds. Many artists promoted the concept on social media, with the process being dubbed "#1DaySongChallenge". The first volume of the project, "Artists for Global Giving | Mixtape #1" was released on March 25, 2020. "Social Distance", the fourth track on the album, is performed by Blue herself.

Blue released a new single titled "Aperture" on 8 May, which was first teased on 15 April. The song was premiered with a live performance on Good Day Chicago. The Deli called the song "ethereal" and said it was "more firmly planted in Dream Pop than Blue's previous singles", while Emma Maliborski of Chicago Haze said it "manages to send listeners to a vibrant landscape through their earbuds".

On 7 August 2020, following a live performance for Jack Daniel's via Audiotree, with two previously unreleased tracks "Prophet" and "Glow", Blue released a single titled "Trump.". The song is a protest song against Donald Trump in the genre of death metal.

Blue announced on Twitter on 27 August 2020 that she would soon release an EP. The expected date of the release is unknown as of now. On 9 October, she followed the news up with a cover of Lady Gaga and Ariana Grande's "Rain on Me", which features vocals from Chicago singer Thair.

On 26 November 2020, Emily Blue's long-term songwriting partner Max Perenchio died at the age of 33 in a car crash in Southern California. Perenchio produced the vast majority of her releases up until that point.

On 31 January 2021, the singer announced her third album, titled The Afterlove.

Emily Blue's first single of 2021, "7 Minutes", was released on 12 February. According to Wiwibloggs, it was sent to the song selection committee for Melodi Grand Prix 2021 before being released as a single. The song is the first release from Blue's third studio album, which is set to be released Summer 2021. Blue said the song was dedicated to Max Perenchio, who co-wrote the song several weeks before his death.

"7 Minutes" was featured on Noisey's Top Tracks of February 2021.

The second single from the album, "See U in My Dreams", was initially scheduled to be released in June 2021. However, its release was postponed to July 23rd. It was met with positive reception, making it onto two of Spotify's biggest pop playlists. On the week of its release, the song peaked #35 on the Israeli digital charts, marking the singer's Top 40 debut.

On 4 August, Blue revealed on an Instagram livestream that The Afterlove would come out "soon", announcing that one more single would precede the album release.

Personal life
Blue resides in Chicago, Illinois and Nashville, Tennessee. She is a supporter of LGBT rights and pro-LGBT organizations.

Blue is openly pansexual, and non-binary and goes by she/they pronouns.

Discography

Albums 
Another Angry Woman (2016)
*69 (2019)
The Afterlove (2022)

Mixtapes
Artists for Global Giving: Salud (2020)

Live albums 
Emily Blue on Audiotree Live (2019)

EPs 
Blackberries//Rico Acid (2017)
*69 EP (2018)
#1DaySongChallenge (2020)

Singles 
"No Pain" (2016)
"Gene" (2016)
"Empower (We Grow)" (2017)
"Cellophane" (2018)
"Microscope" (2018)
"Call Me" (2019)
"Bad Decisions" (2019)
"17" (2019)
"Aperture" (2020)
"Trump." (2020)
"Rain on Me" (2020)
"7 Minutes" (2021)
"See U in My Dreams" (2021)

Awards and nominations

Notes

References

External links 
 

1994 births
Living people
21st-century American women singers
21st-century Norwegian women singers
Bisexual singers
Norwegian bisexual people
American bisexual people
Norwegian LGBT singers
American LGBT singers
Norwegian pop singers
Norwegian singer-songwriters
Norwegian sopranos
Norwegian heavy metal singers
Norwegian non-binary people
American non-binary people
English-language singers from Norway
Synth-pop singers
Non-binary singers
20th-century Norwegian LGBT people
21st-century Norwegian LGBT people
LGBT people from Illinois
Bisexual non-binary people
Electronic musicians
American synth-pop musicians
American women pop singers